Third World socialism is a political philosophy and variant of socialism that has been proposed by Michel Aflaq, Salah al-Din al-Bitar, Zulfikar Ali Bhutto, Buddhadasa, Fidel Castro, Muammar Gaddafi, Saddam Hussein, Juan Domingo Perón, Modibo Keïta, Walter Lini, Gamal Abdel Nasser, Jawaharlal Nehru, Kwame Nkrumah, Julius Nyerere, Sukarno, Ahmed Sékou Touré and other socialist leaders of the Third World who saw socialism as the answer to a strong and developed nation.

Third World socialism is made up of African socialism, Arab socialism, Buddhist socialism, Islamic socialism, Melanesian socialism, Nasserism, and Nehruism. Gaddafi's version was more inspired in the ideas of Arab nationalism, direct democracy, strongman politics and national liberation struggle while Bhutto's was more Western-aligned and resembled, allied and inspired itself in the ideas of Western democratic socialism/social democracy and had membership in the Socialist International.

In the 21st century, the pink tide, with its anti-Americanism, connection with the less developed Eastern Europe, a unity and sense of underdevelopment among developing countries and pro-Arabism, is a new kind of Third World socialism, of which Latin American socialism of the 21st century take part as an ideologically specific form of Third Worldism.

African socialism 
The leaders of African socialism were Julius Nyerere, first president of Tanzania after the independence, who coined the concept of Ujamaa and collectivized the land; Kwame Nkrumah, first president of Ghana, who was one of the fathers of the Non-Aligned Movement, praised state planning policies like the five-year plans and an agency for the regulation of cocoa exports and in several political speeches and writings developed his theory of 
African socialism; Modibo Keïta, father of Mali; and Ahmed Sékou Touré, father of Guinea.

Arab socialism 
The main figures of Arab socialism are Gamal Abdel Nasser, second president of Egypt, who nationalized the Suez Canal, and the Ba'ath Party, founded in Syria by Michel Aflaq, which gained popularity in the whole Arab world and reached the government in Syria (1963-present) and Iraq (1963-2003).

Middle Eastern socialism 
Iran experienced a short Third World socialism period at the zenith of the Tudeh Party after the abdication of Reza Shah and his replacement by his son, Mohammad Reza Pahlavi (though the party never rose to power). After failing to reach power, this form of third world socialism was replaced by Mosaddegh's populist, non-aligned Iranian nationalism of the National Front party as the main anti-monarchy force in Iran, reaching power (1949–1953), and it remained with that strength even in opposition (after the overthrow of Mossadegh) until the rise of Islamism and the Iranian Revolution. The Tudehs have moved towards basic socialist communism since then.

Kemalism can very arguably be added to the list, as it appeared before the notion of Third World was created in post-World War II, it added populism to the equation (something not all Third World socialists did; Nasser and Nkrumah, for example, did) and Turkey is more developed than the typical notion of a Third World country, but as it was used as a model of government after the Turkish War of Independence to rebuild Turkey and recover it from the underdevelopment of the Ottoman Empire, creating a strong nation in face of the prospect of European colonialism, it can be considered as reaching the templates of a Third World socialism movement. From the 1960s onwards, Third World socialist and Third Worldist thought influenced left-Kemalism.

The Kemalist experiment, Fabian socialism and social democracy in general and the main Third World communist country, the People's Republic of China, were big influences on the movement. Despite being inspired by social democracy, most of these states were affected in one time or the other by strongmen or big man leaders or one-party systems. In any case, most Third World socialist states are followers of social democratic reformism (normally state-guided), preferring it to revolution, although some adopted a kind of permanent revolution stance on the social progress to a socialist society.

Latin American socialism 
Many Latin American thinkers argued that the United States used Latin American countries as "peripheral economies" at the expense of Latin American social and economic development, which many saw as an extension of neo-colonialism and neo-imperialism. This shift in thinking led to a surge of dialogue related to how Latin America could assert its social and economic independence from the United States. Many scholars argued that a shift to socialism could help liberate Latin America from this conflict.

The New Left emerged in Latin America, a group which sought to go beyond existing Marxist–Leninist efforts at achieving economic equality and democracy to include social reform and address issues unique to Latin America such as racial and ethnic equality, indigenous rights and environmental issues. Notable New Left movements in Latin America include the Cuban Revolution of 1959, the victory of the Sandinista revolution in Nicaragua of 1979, the Workers' Party government in Porto Alegre of 1990, among others.

Because of its close proximity and strong historical connection to the United States, Cuba served an integral role in spreading socialism to the rest of Latin America. Che Guevara described Cuba as "a guiding light" to Latin American countries caught in conflict between imperialism and socialism. In Guevara's speech "On Revolutionary Medicine", he recounts his travels through Latin America and the misery, hunger and disease he witnessed and explained how a shift to socialism could help alleviate these struggles. As part of the New Left, Fidel Castro and Che Guevara implemented leftist politics in Cuba while incorporating policies aimed at addressing social issues. Cuban officials intended for Cuba to spur similar leftist revolutions in the rest of Latin America, what he saw as a common "liberation struggle", in countries like Venezuela, Bolivia and Nicaragua.

In the case of Juan Perón, elected president of Argentina on three times, the Third World socialist stance was a more radical variation of populism which aligned itself with the Third World and the Non-Aligned Movement (what Perón called "the third position"), with a significant state intervention for development such as five-year plans, the nationalization of railways, ports and banks, the creation of an agency to regulate grain exports (the IAPI) and the establishment of a modern welfare state. Despite his progressive policies, Perón did not define himself or his doctrine as "socialist" during his first presidencies (1946–1952 and 1952–1955), but he did later during his exile and during his third presidency (1973–1974) when he coined the term "national socialism", sort of an Argentine way to socialism, which he described as a social democracy mainly modeled after the "Swedish model" and also inspired by other non-aligned, Third World socialist models such as Christian socialism, Nasserism and the corporatist policies of European 1920s, 1930s and 1940s fascism.

See also 
 Maoism (Third Worldism)
 Non-Aligned Movement
 Third Positionism
 Third-Worldism
 Three Worlds Theory

References

External links 
 Economic Reform and Third-World Socialism: A Political Economy of Food Policy in Post-Revolutionary Societies.

Non-Aligned Movement
Political ideologies
Third-Worldism
Types of socialism
Imperialism studies